Nemanja Vučićević (born 11 August 1979) is a Serbian former professional footballer who played as an attacking midfielder.

During his journeyman career, Vučićević represented numerous clubs in his country and abroad, spending the most time at TSV 1860 Munich and 1. FC Köln. He also played for OFK Beograd, Lokomotiv Moscow and Hapoel Tel Aviv.

Club statistics

References

External links
 
 
 
 
 Superleague Greece profile

1. FC Köln players
2. Bundesliga players
Anorthosis Famagusta F.C. players
Association football midfielders
Bundesliga players
Cypriot First Division players
Expatriate footballers in Cyprus
Expatriate footballers in Germany
Expatriate footballers in Greece
Expatriate footballers in Indonesia
Expatriate footballers in Israel
Expatriate footballers in Japan
Expatriate footballers in Russia
Expatriate footballers in Turkey
FC Lokomotiv Moscow players
FC Tokyo players
Hapoel Tel Aviv F.C. players
Liga 1 (Indonesia) players
J1 League players
Kavala F.C. players
Manisaspor footballers
OFK Beograd players
PSM Makassar players
Russian Premier League players
Serbia and Montenegro under-21 international footballers
Serbian expatriate footballers
Serbian expatriate sportspeople in Cyprus
Serbian expatriate sportspeople in Germany
Serbian expatriate sportspeople in Greece
Serbian expatriate sportspeople in Indonesia
Serbian expatriate sportspeople in Israel
Serbian expatriate sportspeople in Japan
Serbian expatriate sportspeople in Russia
Serbian expatriate sportspeople in Turkey
Serbian footballers
Footballers from Belgrade
Super League Greece players
Süper Lig players
TSV 1860 Munich players
1979 births
Living people